This is a complete list of current bridges and other crossings of Four Mile Run from its mouth at the Potomac River to its source.

Crossings 
All locations are in Virginia. Pedestrian-only bridges are marked in italics.

References 

Four Mile Run